is a brand of beer made in Minakuchi-shuzō’s microbrewery in Dōgo, Matsuyama, Ehime, Japan. One of the features of Dogo Beer is its stronger bubbles, as it is intended to be drunk after taking a bath at Dōgo Onsen.

Dogo beer has three flavors: Botchan (Kölsch), Madonna (Alt), and Sōseki (stout).

History 
Minakuchi Shuzo, which makes Dogo Beer, was founded during the Japanese Meiji era in 1895. Dogo beer was created in August of 1996. 

Dogo Beer can be purchased at Nikitasu kurabu, a retail shop. Dogo Beer is also served at Nikitatsuan, a restaurant, which opened in October 1996. Fresh Dogo Beer can be purchased at Dogo Biru Kan, which opened in November 1996 in front of Dogo Onsen.

Types of Dogo Beer 
According to the Beer Tengoku Website, there are four main types of Dogo beer (the site explains further what these are):

 Dogo Botchan
 Dogo Madonna
 Dogo Soseki
 Dogo Nobosan

Making Dogo Beer 

According to a Dogo beer company pamphlet, Dogo beer is made according to the following procedures, which are in line with the brewing practices most commonly used today:
Malt is put into hot water, and then the malt starch changes into malt sugar.
Liquid is filtered, and made to be clear.
Hops are added and heated up enough, at that moment the particular smell and bitter taste of beer are generated.
Solid protein is removed and leaving a transparent liquid.
It is cooled in a bacteria-free condition.
Oxygen and beer yeast are added into it causing fermentation. The yeast makes sugar split into alcohol and carbonic acid.
It is poured into some containers and aged at 0 degrees to make its taste mild.

References

External links
 Dogo Beer home page (in Japanese)

Beer in Japan
Japanese brands
Products introduced in 1996